The 2022 Interwetten European Darts Open was the fifth of thirteen PDC European Tour events on the 2022 PDC Pro Tour. The tournament took place at the Ostermann-Arena, Leverkusen, Germany, from 6–8 May 2022. It featured a field of 48 players and £140,000 in prize money, with £25,000 going to the winner.

Michael van Gerwen entered the event as defending champion, having defeated Rob Cross 8–6 in the 2019 final. He successfully defended his title with an 8–5 win over Dimitri Van den Bergh in the final.

Prize money
The prize money is unchanged from the European Tours of the last 3 years:

 Seeded players who lose in the second round and host nation qualifiers (who qualify automatically as a result of their ranking) who lose in their first match of the event shall not be credited with prize money on any Order of Merit. A player who qualifies as a qualifier, but later becomes a seed due to the withdrawal of one or more other players shall be credited with their prize money on all Orders of Merit regardless of how far they progress in the event.

Qualification and format
The top 16 entrants from the PDC ProTour Order of Merit on 16 March automatically qualified for the event and were seeded in the second round.

The remaining 32 places went to players from six qualifying events – 24 from the Tour Card Holder Qualifier (held on 18 March), two from the Associate Member Qualifier (held on 22 April), the two highest ProTour ranking German players, two from the Host Nation Qualifier (held on 22 April), one from the Nordic & Baltic Associate Member Qualifier (held on 19 February), and one from the East European Associate Member Qualifier (held on 6 March).

Danny Baggish withdrew from the event owing to personal reasons, so Karel Sedláček received a bye into the second round.

James Wade withdrew from his semi-final match due to illness, so Dimitri Van den Bergh received a bye into the final.

The following players took part in the tournament:

Top 16
  (third round)
  (second round)
  (third round)
  (third round)
  (champion)
  (quarter-finals)
  (runner-up)
  (semi-finals)
  (third round)
  (second round)
  (second round)
  (third round)
  (quarter-finals)
  (semi-finals, withdrew)
  (second round)
  (quarter-finals)

Tour Card Qualifier
  (first round)
  (second round)
  (second round)
  (first round)
  (first round)
  (second round)
  (first round)
  (first round)
  (third round)
  (second round)
  (second round)
  (quarter-finals)
  (second round)
  (first round)
  (second round)
  (first round)
  (second round)
  (first round)
  (first round)
  (first round)
  (second round)
  (first round)
  (first round)

Associate Member Qualifier
  (second round)
  (third round)

Highest Ranked Germans
  (first round)
  (third round)

Host Nation Qualifier
  (first round)
  (first round)

Nordic & Baltic Qualifier
  (second round)

East European Qualifier
  (second round)

Draw

Notes

References

2022 PDC Pro Tour
2022 PDC European Tour
2022 in German sport
May 2022 sports events in Germany